Emmikhoven is a former village in the Dutch province of North Brabant. It was located just south of Almkerk, on the other side of the small river Alm, and is now a part of that village.

Emmikhoven and nearby Waardhuizen formed a separate municipality until 1879, under the name Emmikhoven en Waardhuizen or Emmikhoven c.a., when it was merged with Almkerk.

References

Former populated places in the Netherlands
Populated places in North Brabant
Geography of Altena, North Brabant